Turn On to Love is a 1969 film directed by John G. Avildsen and starring Sharon Kent, Richard Michaels, and Luigi Mastroianni. The film marks Avildsen's feature directorial debut.

Premise
A bored housewife starts spending time in liberal Greenwich Village, where she gets involved with pot-smoking hippies and an Italian filmmaker.

Cast
 Sharon Kent as Janice
 Richard Michaels as Gerard
 Luigui Mastroianni as Rico
 Jackie Riley as Randy
 Frank Rogers as Roach
 Elizabeth Tarrington as Betty
 Steve Wingate as Henry

Reception

Roger Greenspun of The New York Times found the film average but liked the fact that it is not preachy when it comes to its subjects, and had harsh words for the lead actress:

See also

 List of American films of 1969

References

External links 
 
 

1969 films
1969 drama films
American black-and-white films
American drama films
American films about cannabis
Films directed by John G. Avildsen
Films set in New York City
Films shot in New York City
Hippie films
1969 directorial debut films
1960s English-language films
1960s American films